Leo Townsend was an American football and basketball coach.  He served as the fifth head football coach at the North Carolina College for Negroes—now known as North Carolina Central University—in Durham, North Carolina and he held that position for four seasons, from 1932 until 1935, compiling a record of 16–18.  Townsend was also the head basketball coach at North Carolina Central for one season, in 1935–36, tallying a mark of 0–11.

References

Year of birth missing
Year of death missing
North Carolina Central Eagles football coaches
North Carolina Central Eagles men's basketball coaches